Kildare Senior Football League Division 4 is an annual Gaelic football competition contested by the Kildare GAA clubs. 14 clubs play 13 games and are awarded 2 points per win and 1 point per draw. The top two teams qualify to play in the League Final.

Finals listed by year

References

External links
 
 
 

Gaelic football competitions in County Kildare